Messier 75 or M75, also known as NGC 6864, is a giant globular cluster of stars in the southern constellation Sagittarius. It was discovered by Pierre Méchain in 1780 and included in Charles Messier's catalog of comet-like objects that same year.

M75 is about 67,500 light years away from Earth and is 14,700 light years away from, and on the opposite side of, the Galactic Center. Its apparent size on the sky translates to a true radius of 67 light years. M75 is classified as class I, meaning it is one of the more densely concentrated globular clusters known. The absolute magnitude of M75 is about −8.5, equating to 180,000 times more luminous than the Sun.

The mass density at the core is ·pc−3. There are 38 RR Lyrae variable stars and the cluster appears to be Oosterhoff-intermediate in terms of metallicity. 62 candidate blue stragglers have been identified in the cluster field, with 60% being in the core region.

Messier 75 is part of the Gaia Sausage, the hypothesized remains of a dwarf galaxy that merged with the Milky Way. It is a halo object with an orbital period of 0.4 billion years to travel around the galaxy on a very pronounced ellipse, specifically eccentricity of 0.87.

Gallery

See also
 List of Messier objects

References and footnotes

External links

 Messier 75, Galactic Globular Clusters Database page

 

Messier 075
Messier 075
075
Messier 075
 Gaia-Enceladus
Astronomical objects discovered in 1780